Sessvollmoen is a village in the municipality of Ullensaker, Norway. Its population (2005) is 653.

Villages in Akershus
Ullensaker